Hugo Vogel (born 4 January 2004) is a French professional footballer who plays as a left-back for Swiss Super League club Basel.

Early life 
Vogel was born in Pierre Bénite, but raised in Vénissieux, a town in Lyon Metropolis, starting to play football in the neighboring Vénissieux, before joining the Olympique Lyonnais academy in 2013.

Club career

Lyon
During the 2021–22 season, Vogel was along with Chaïm El Djebali and Mohamed El Arouch one of only three players born after 2004 to play in the National 2 Lyon reserve squad.

As both Sinaly Diomande and Léo Dubois were missing due to injury, Vogel made his professional debut for Olympique Lyonnais on 25 November 2021, replacing Malo Gusto in a 3–1 away Europa League win against Brøndby. The Pierre-Bénite-born player then started at right-back in Les Gones' final Europa League group game against Rangers. The club drew 1–1 and finished the group stage as unbeaten leaders.

Basel
In July 2022, after his contract with Lyon terminated, he decided to leave the club and signed for Swiss Super League club FC Basel on a four year contract. He joined Basel's first team for their 2022–23 season under head coach Alexander Frei. After playing in one test game, Vogel made his debut for his new club in the 2022–23 Swiss Cup away match against local amateur club FC Allschwil on 21 August 2022. Basel won by five goals to nil and advanced to the next round.

International career 
Vogel is a youth international with France, having been a regular with both the under-16 and – after the covid pandemic – the under-18.

Style of play 
Playing mainly as a left-back in the Lyon Academy, he also played at right-back with the reserve, a position where he eventually made his professional debut in 2021.

Honours
Lyon Youth
Coupe Gambardella: 2021-2022

References

External links

2004 births
Living people
Sportspeople from Lyon Metropolis
Footballers from Mulhouse
French footballers
Association football defenders
France youth international footballers
Olympique Lyonnais players
Footballers from Auvergne-Rhône-Alpes